Stig Jäder (born 11 August 1954) is a Swedish former cross-country skier. He competed in the 30 km event at the 1980 Winter Olympics.

Cross-country skiing results

Olympic Games

References

1954 births
Living people
Swedish male cross-country skiers
Olympic cross-country skiers of Sweden
Cross-country skiers at the 1980 Winter Olympics
People from Sandviken Municipality
20th-century Swedish people